Jens Arnsted (born 4 July 1961), more commonly known as Yenz Leonhardt or Yenz Cheyenne, is a Danish heavy metal musician. He has performed as a vocalist, guitarist and bassist throughout his career, focusing on the latter in recent years.

Biography
Born in Vordingborg, Leonhardt joined Brats in 1979 as bass player and vocalist along with future Mercyful Fate members Rene Krölmark (Hank Shermann/Hank De Wank), Carsten van der Volsing and Kim Bendix Petersen (King Diamond) and later performed with former Europe drummer Tony Niemistö (Tony Reno) and former King Diamond guitarist Pete Blakk in the short-lived band Geisha as Yenz Cheyenne. Leonhardt and Niemistö then went on to form the band Y together with King Diamond bassist Hal Patino and guitarist Oliver Steffensen from Mike Tramp's band Freak of Nature. Leonhardt performs on albums by all the above bands.

In more recent years, Leonhardt has featured prominently in the German power metal scene, often collaborating with Piet Sielck in the bands Iron Savior and Savage Circus. He currently plays in Stormwarrior. He is also the touring bass player for Lacrimosa. Leonhardt played rhythm guitar for the hard rock band Kingdom Come, but left in September 2007 over scheduling conflicts.

In 2010, Leonhardt temporarily replaced bassist Nibbs Carter in British metal band Saxon for one tour.

Discography

With Stormwarrior 
 Heading Northe (2008) lyrics (tracks 7, 8, 10), bass 
 Heathen Warrior (2011) vocals, bass 
 Thunder & Steele (2014) vocals, bass 
 Norsemen (We Are) (single) (2019) vocals, bass 
 Norsemen (2019) vocals, bass

Videography with Lacrimosa 
 Musikkurzfilme 1993-2005 (2005) (bass, actor) 
 Lichtjahre (2007) (documentary) (bass) 
 Live in Mexico City (2015) (bass)

References

External links 

 Official Iron Savior homepage
 Official Savage Circus homepage
 Official Stormwarrior homepage

Living people
Danish heavy metal guitarists
Iron Savior members
Kingdom Come (band) members
Savage Circus members
Danish heavy metal bass guitarists
People from Vordingborg Municipality
1961 births